Marquis of Porto Seguro (in Portuguese Marquês de Porto Seguro) was a Portuguese title of nobility created by a royal decree of king Philip III of Portugal (aka Philipe IV of Spain) dated from 8 April 1627, and granted to D. Afonso of Lencastre, 2nd son of Álvaro of Lencastre, 3rd Duke of Aveiro.

Afonso always supported the Habsburg kings and even after the Portuguese revolution of 1 December 1640, he remained faithful to the Spanish Dynasty.

Later, by a decree issued on 23 March 1642, King Philip granted him the titles of Duke of Abrantes and Marquis of Sardoal. However, as Philip IV was no longer King of Portugal, they were never recognise by the Portuguese authorities.

List of the Marquesses of Porto Seguro (1627)
Afonso of Lencastre (1597–1654), also 1st Duke of Abrantes and 1st Marquis of Sardoal (titles not valid in Portugal)

Marquis of Puerto Seguro (Spanish title)
Afonso's son, Agustin de Lancastre Padilla y Bobadilla (1639- ? ), inherited his father's House and honours, namely the title of Marquis of Porto Seguro, which still exist in Spain as Marquis of Puerto Seguro (Spanish spelling) as a Spanish title. This title was never recognized by the Dynasty of Braganza.

See also
List of Marquesses in Portugal

External links
Genealogy of the Marquesses of Porto Seguro, in Portuguese

Bibliography
"Nobreza de Portugal e do Brasil" – Vol. III, page 173. Published by Zairol Lda., Lisbon 1989.

Portuguese nobility